The Mayor of San José is the general administrator and legal representative of the Municipality of San José, the capital of the Republic of Costa Rica and the largest and most populated municipality in the country. The position officially exists since the municipal reform of 1998 as part of the bipartisan agreements of the Figueres-Calderón Pact. Before this the municipalities were administered by a figure similar to a general manager appointed by the Municipal Council and called Municipal Executive, but after the reform this figure disappears replaced by the popularly elected mayor.

The longest serving person in the office has been Johnny Araya Monge of the National Liberation Party, who was previously municipal executive for several consecutive periods and who has served for more than 22 years (if the time he was a municipal executive) is included.

List

Municipal Executives

Mayors

See also
 List of mayors in Costa Rica
 Local government in Costa Rica

References

Political office-holders in Costa Rica
San José, Costa Rica